The impression seal is a common seal that leaves an impression, typically in clay and less often in sealing wax.  In antiquity they were common, largely because they served to authenticate legal documents, such as tax receipts, contracts, wills and decrees. They are favorite topics of study because they were usually carved with important "themes" of the society that produced them, rather than with an ordinary signature.
 
The two most common types are the cylinder seal and the stamp seal.  There are many cylinder seals, with religious or mythological themes; a famous one depicts Darius I.  Stamp seals include the LMLK seals from Lachish (ca 700 BC) and seals in Tell Halaf.

Others, less common, include the Egyptian, Levantine, or Canaanite scaraboid seals, and the metal stamp seal.

References

Cuneiform Texts in the Metropolitan Museum of Art: Tablets, Cones, and Bricks of the Third and Second Millennia B.C., vol. 1 (New York, 1988).  The final section(Bricks) of the book concerns "Cylinder Seals", with a Foreword describing the purpose of the section as to instigate Research into Cylinder Seals.  The 'cylinder sealing' on the Bricks, was done multiple times per brick.  Some are of high quality, and some are not.

See also

 Bulla (seal)

Seals (insignia)
-